Asmaa bint Saqr Al Qasimi Arabic: سمو الشيخة الشاعرة أسماء بنت صقر القاسمي (born 24 December in Kalba, Sharjah, United Arab Emirates) is a female poet.  she had published 5 poetry books. In addition to philosophy and comparative religious studies, she gained a B.A in Political Science and Economics.

Background
Asmaa bint Saqr Al Qasimi is the founder and CEO of Sadana Foundation for Thought and Literature. She is a member of the World Poetry Movement  in Chile and a sponsor of the Encyclopaedia of Arab Poets. Her poems have been translated into English, French, and Spanish.

She is a daughter of a former governor of Sharjah Emirate, Sheikh Saqr Al Qasimi. In addition to Sadana Foundation, she is the president of Kalba Sporting and Cultural Club for Girls. Sheikha Asmaa Al Qasimi is an honorary member of a number of local, regional, and international clubs for literature such as: The International League of Islamic Literature, The House of Poetry of Morocco, Fonxe Academy for Arabic Poetry, among others.

Publications
 In the Temple of Sorrow (2008) 
 Ishtar Prayer (2008)       
 Gemstones of my Blood (2009)  In Spanish and Arabic
 A Perfume's Whiff (2009) in English, Spanish, and Arabic
 A Crucible of Musk (2010) 
 Tayrason Nostalgia (2013)  in English, French, and Arabic

References 

Living people
21st-century Emirati poets
Emirati women poets
20th-century Emirati poets
21st-century Emirati writers
21st-century Emirati women writers
Asmaa bint Saqr Al Qasimi
Year of birth missing (living people)